Guaymas Municipality is a municipality in Sonora in north-western Mexico. In 2015, the municipality had a total population of 158,046. The municipal seat is the city of Guaymas.

Government

Municipal rulers

References

External links
http://guaymas.gob.mx Guaymas municipal authority

 
Municipalities of Sonora